Colasposoma hajeki is a species of leaf beetle endemic to Socotra. It was described by Stefano Zoia in 2012. The species is named after Jiří Hájek, who collected some of the material studied.

References

hajeki
Beetles of Asia
Endemic fauna of Socotra
Insects of the Arabian Peninsula
Beetles described in 2012